Vanished, also known as Danielle Steel's Vanished, is a 1995 American made-for-television romantic drama film directed by George Kaczender and starring George Hamilton, Robert Hays and Lisa Rinna. The film is based on the 1993 novel of the same name by Danielle Steel.

Plot
Marielle is happily married to Charles Delauney, and they have a four-year-old son together, Andre. After being visited by Marielle's parents, who warn her about Charles, Marielle, Charles and Andre go on holiday in Switzerland. While Marielle is being greeted by a neighbor, Andre tries to get his ball from the lake and ends up drowning. Charles blames Marielle, and she ends up having a nervous breakdown.

Two years later, Charles visits her in a hospital and tells her he still loves her, and although she confesses she loves him too, she says they can't rebuild the past. They divorce, and Marielle begins a new life in New York.

There, she meets Malcolm Patterson, the only person to employ her. After showering her with gifts and romantic meals, Malcolm proposes, and after much persuasion she accepts. Shortly after they are married, Malcolm and Marielle begin trying for a baby and when she is unable to conceive, Malcolm is clearly angry. She attempts to tell him about her past but he doesn't listen, and tells her never to think about the past. Three months later, she visits him at the office and is introduced to his new secretary, Ms. Saunders. She announces she is pregnant.

Malcolm hires a nanny for Marielle, much to her annoyance. When their son Theodore is born, the nanny insists that consistency is important in Teddy's life.

Malcolm begins preparing a train set for Christmas. Marielle attempts to tell him about the anniversary of her first son's death, but he cuts her short. The next day, she goes to church and lights a candle for Andre alone, however bumps into her ex-husband Charles there. They talk about the past and share a hug, which is witnessed by her chauffeur.

The next day, Marielle takes Teddy to the park and once again, sees Charles. He is angry that Marielle didn't mention having another son, and says it's not fair that she has a husband, a new life and a son and he has nothing. He then asks her if she'd go to the ends of the earth to find someone she loved, and she hurries off.

That night she is on the phone to Malcolm and hears something upstairs. She tells Malcolm who tells her not to worry. After they end the phone call she goes upstairs anyway and sees the nanny gagged and tied up, and discovers Teddy is missing.

While the house is being searched, detective John Taylor questions the servants and the chauffeur tells about how he saw Marielle with Charles. John then questions Marielle and Malcolm listens, stunned, while she tells about her past. Marielle insists it isn't in Charles's nature to hurt a child.

The police search Charles's house and find Teddy's blue pyjamas there. He is arrested on suspicion of kidnap. Marielle goes to the police station and Charles insists he didn't kidnap Teddy.

In court, all the evidence seems to be pointing to Charles. However, outside John Taylor reveals to Marielle that Malcolm knew all about her past.

It is later revealed that Malcolm kidnapped his own son - he had been having an affair with Ms. Saunders and that he was going to start a new life with her and Teddy, and that he'd only married Marielle to get a baby, as Ms. Saunders was infertile.

Marielle and Malcolm divorce, and at the end of the film, John reveals he loves Marielle as she prepares to begin a new life with Teddy in Vermont.

Cast
 George Hamilton as Malcolm Patterson
 Lisa Rinna as Marielle Delauney
 Robert Hays as John Taylor
 Maurice Godwin as Charles Delauney
 Alex D. Linz as Teddy
 Daniela Akerblom as Ms. Saunders
 Ron Lea as Tom Armour

External links
 

1995 television films
1995 films
1995 romantic drama films
American romantic drama films
Films shot in Montreal
Films directed by George Kaczender
NBC Productions films
NBC network original films
Films based on works by Danielle Steel
1990s English-language films
1990s American films